Niqmepa (died  1270 BC) was the fifth-from-last King of Ugarit, a city-state in northwestern Syria.

Reign 
He was the son of Niqmaddu II, and the brother and successor of Arhalba.

Niqmepa was installed by the Hittite king Mursili II after forcing the former king, his brother Arhalba to abdicate the throne in favour of him, and was forced to sign a new treaty declaring explicitly that Ugarit was a vassal state of the Hittites. The treaty reveals that Niqmepa had a harem, and states that his woman and children will be held responsible if he fails to honor his obligations. At the same time Ugarit lost control of the territory of Shiyannu to the east, which halved the area controlled by Niqmepa. The secession was confirmed by Mursili II and Shiyannu was placed under the direct control of Carchemish, which was ruled by descendants of Hittite kings as "viceroys". However, because of the loss of Shiyannu, and by request from Niqmepa, the tribute of Ugarit was reduced by a third. During Niqmepa's reign Ugarit became entirely encircled by areas under Hittite control.

Niqmepa married princess Ahatmilku, of the Amurru kingdom to the south.

Death 
After a long reign of about 50 years as the vassal of four successive Hittite kings, Niqmepa was succeeded by his son, the lesser known Ammittamru II.

References

Ugaritic kings
1270s BC deaths
14th-century BC rulers
13th-century BC rulers
Year of birth unknown
14th-century BC people
13th-century BC people